Ghost House is a 2004 South Korean horror-comedy film. It was released in South Korea on September 7, 2004, and was the fourth best selling film of the year with 2,890,000 tickets sold.

Plot
Pil-gi (Cha Seung-won) has finally saved enough money to make his late father's wish come true: He can buy his own house. However, upon moving into his new residence, he is bothered by one if its previous residents, a poltergeist, who claims the house belongs to it and attempts to scare him out. Pil-gi will not give up on his dream so easily, though. He calls the police, invites friends to stay for the night, and tries exorcism rituals. None of it works. During one attack by the poltergeist he is struck by lightning and awakes in a hospital. He eventually decides it would be best to sell the house, but upon returning he discovers that he can see the ghost who has been haunting him. She reveals that her name is Yeon-hwa (Jang Seo-hee) and, now less frightened, Pil-gi talks to her and he decides to stay. However, an investor looking to build a new hotel on the site makes Pil-gi an offer to buy the house. Now it is Yeon-hwa's turn to be afraid. She begs him not to sell the house and tells him her life story. Pil-gi vows to help her keep her house.

Cast
 Cha Seung-won as Pil-gi
 Jang Seo-hee as Yeon-hwa
 Jang Hang-sun as Jang Kil-bok
 Son Tae-young as Soo-kyung
 Jin Yoo-young as property developer
 Yoon Moon-sik as Pil-gi's father
 Jang Hyun-sung as Park Gi-tae
 Jang Hang-jun as property house owner
 Park Yeong-gyu as man crawling out of TV set
 Tae In-ho as a group member near the police station

See also
Haunted house
List of ghost films

References

External links 
 
 
 

Cinema Service films
2000s Korean-language films
South Korean comedy horror films
2004 comedy horror films
2004 films
South Korean ghost films
Films directed by Kim Sang-jin (film director)
Haunted house films
2000s South Korean films